Materials World is a monthly magazine specifically devoted to the engineering materials cycle, from mining and extraction, through processing and application, to recycling and recovery. Editorially, it embraces the whole spectrum of materials and minerals – metals, plastics, polymers, rubber, composites, ceramics and glasses – with particular emphasis on advanced technologies, latest developments and new applications, giving prominence to the topics that are of fundamental importance to those in the industry. It is the member's magazine of The Institute of Materials, Minerals and Mining (IOM3).

References

External links
 Materials World website

Business magazines published in the United Kingdom
Monthly magazines published in the United Kingdom
Engineering magazines
Magazines published in London
Magazines with year of establishment missing
Professional and trade magazines